Harvey Williams may refer to:

 Harvey Williams (American football) (born 1967), former American football running back
 Harvey Williams (musician), English singer, songwriter and guitarist
 Harvey D. Williams (1930–2020), African-American U.S. Army major general
 Harvey Ladew Williams Jr. (1900–1986), American businessman

See also
 Harvey Williams Cushing (1869–1939), American neurosurgeon, pathologist, writer and draftsman
 William Harvey (disambiguation)